Brucker is a surname, and may refer to:

 Ferdinand Brucker (1858–1904), American politician
 Jane Brucker (born 1958), American actress
 Johann Jakob Brucker (1696–1770), German historian of philosophy
 Roger Brucker (born 1929), American cave explorer and author
 Wilber M. Brucker (1894–1968), American politician

See also
 Bruker
 Brooker (disambiguation)
 Bruckner (disambiguation)